The All India Christian Council (AICC) is a nationwide alliance of Christian denominations, mission agencies, institutions, federations and Christian lay leaders.

AICC was formed in 1998 with the declared purpose of to providing a united voice to protect and serve the interests of Indian Christians. The AICC claims to cut across denominational barriers to act against the alleged growing violence and blatant violations of religious freedom in India amongst the Christian community, minorities and other oppressed castes in India.

The Council monitors, documents, advocates and intervenes with the government of India, the national justice system, civil society organizations, and human rights groups. It has relationships with global human rights organizations involved with international advocacy for Dalit human rights and freedom of faith in South Asia. The Council’s national and international network has conducted disaster relief during several natural calamities like the Orissa supercyclone and the Gujarat earthquake.

The council also hosted five meetings for the United Nations Special Rappertour on Religious Freedom, Asma Jehangir, during her last official visit to India.  Another major activity of the council is to constitute fact finding teams for various issues and also conducting human rights awareness seminars across the country. To date, the leadership has completed such seminars in over 55 districts of India and hope to make them in all the 500 districts (the official 625 districts of India put into 500 major districts). The audiences include leaders from various religious communities, local ethnic group leaders, officials, and media.

See also
All India Conference of Indian Christians
Dignity Freedom Network

References

Christian organisations based in India
National councils of churches